Petrophila argyrolepta is a moth in the family Crambidae. It was described by Harrison Gray Dyar Jr. in 1914. It is found in Panama, Costa Rica and Honduras.

References

Petrophila
Moths described in 1914
Moths of Central America